Avtomobilist Karaganda was an ice hockey team in Karaganda, Kazakhstan. They were active from 1966–1996 and from 1998–2000.

History
The club was founded in 1966 as Stroitel Karaganda and played at first in the Vtoraya Liga, the third level of Soviet ice hockey. They won the Vtoraya Liga as Avtomobilist Karaganda in 1980, and were promoted to the Pervaya Liga. From 1992–1996, Karaganda participated in the International Hockey League, which featured teams from the Commonwealth of Independent States. In 1993, they took on their old name of Stroitel again, and dissolved due to financial difficulties in 1996. In 1998, the team was revived as Avtomobilist, but they were dissolved after only one season.

Notable players
 Vladimir Antipin
 Oleg Bolyakin
 Alexander Genze
 Alexei Mursin
 Sergei Mogilnikov
 Waldemar Quapp
 Yerlan Sagymbayev

Notable Coaches
Yuri Baulin

References

External links
 Avtomobilist Karaganda statistics

Defunct ice hockey teams in Kazakhstan
Sport in Karaganda